The Global Initiative Against Transnational Organized Crime, sometimes shortened as Global Initiative,  is an international non-governmental organization headquartered in Geneva.  The organisation is composed of a network of  law enforcement, governance and development practitioners, who share the objective of developing innovative strategies and responses to organized crime. In July 2020, the network counted 500 experts.

The organisation was launched formally at the United Nations headquarters, in New York in September 2013. It was initially established with funding and operational support from both the Governments of Norway and of Switzerland.  The Global Initiative has offices in Geneva, Vienna, Cape Town, and Malta.

The Global Initiative and its reports are regularly cited in publications such as the New York Times, Reuters, Time magazine, Forbes, the BBC, Der Spiegel, World Politic Review, and The Telegraph.

Governance 
The Global Initiative Board for  2017-2020 is composed of Sarah F. Cliffe (Chair), and board members Rodrigo Avila, Gwen Boniface, Solange Ghernaouti, Misha Glenny, Marc Hofstetter, Kristin Kvigne, Nick Lewis, Moises Naim, Mary Jane C. Ortega and Gladwell Otieno. The leadership team is composed of Mark Shaw (Director) and Tuesday Reitano (Deputy Director).

Activities and partnerships 
The Global Initiative has published numerous publications, reports and policy briefs on organised crime. It has published a report together with the World Wide Fund for Nature on combatting environmental crime.

According to,  the Global Initiative is the first organisation which  analysed the risks and dangers associated with the infiltration of criminal organisations into the management of the COVID-19 pandemic, including a focus on the  social and economic results. In March 2020, the organisation published a report of which summarized the impact of the COVID-19 pandemic on crime.

The Global Initiative  provides  briefings to the United Nation Security Council, highlighting that the United Nations System needs a coherent, streamlined and strategic approach to combat organized crime and to reduce its negative impacts on peace and prosperity.

Together  with  Poseidon Aquatic Resource Management Ltd., the Global Initiative developed an illegal, unreported and unregulated fishing index for  coastal states, which measures  the degree to which states are exposed to and effectively combat IUU fishing.

The Global Initiative co-organizes workshops with  the United Nations Office on Drugs and Crime  focusing on non-governmental alliances and developing multi-stakeholder engagement, in the context of the United Nations Convention against Transnational Organized Crime (UNTOC).

Together with Babson College and the International Organization for Migration, the Global Initiative is a founder of the  Responsible and Ethical Private Sector Coalition against Trafficking (RESPECT) initiative, which  aims to find  solutions to modern slavery in the public and private sectors.

The Global Initiative has partnerships with Interpol, and Wilton Park. It is a member of the  Geneva Center for Security Sector Governance, and of the  Global Risk Governance programme.

References 

International organizations based in Europe